The Austrian expedition to Brazil (Österreichische Brasilien-Expedition) was a scientific expedition which explored Brazil. It was organized and financed by the Austrian Empire from 1817 to 1835.

History
The expedition had as its main supporter the Austrian statesman Prince Metternich and the expedition was associated with the politically significant marriage of Dom Pedro of Brazil and Archduchess Leopoldine of Austria. Overall planning was overseen by Metternich and scientific planning was undertaken by Carl Franz von Schreibers.

The contingent of fourteen naturalists included Johann Christian Mikan, Carl Friedrich Philipp von Martius, Giuseppe Raddi, Heinrich Wilhelm Schott, Johann Baptist von Spix, Johann Baptist Emanuel Pohl, Johann Natterer, Ferdinand Dominik Sochor (Imperial hunter and a skilled taxidermist) and the artists Thomas Ender and Johann Buchberger. A thirteen-room "Brazilian Museum" containing 133,000 objects from the expedition was opened to the public. It was closed in 1836 and the contents integrated with those of the Hof-Naturalienkabinette, now the Natural History Museum of Vienna.

References

 Kann, Bettina:  Die österreichische Brasilienexpedition 1817 - 1836 unter besonderer Berücksichtigung ethnographischen Ergebnisse.  Diplomarbeit Wien 1992
 Riedl-Dorn, Christa:  Johann Natterer und die österreichische Brasilienexpedition.  Petrópolis 1999
 Steinle, Robert:  Historische Hintergründe österreichischen Brasilienexpedition (1817-1835) mit einer Dokumentation der Bororo-Bestände aus Sammlung Natterer des Museums für Völkerkunde in Wien.  Dissertation Wien 2000

Sources
de:Österreichische Brasilien-Expedition

External links
 Colecção de Johann Natterer in the Museum für Völkerkunde
 Virtual course of the expedition (in German)

Historiography of Brazil
Austria
Austrian Empire
19th century in Brazil
Botanical expeditions
Scientific expeditions
South American expeditions
Explorers of Amazonia